Genoplesium oliganthum, commonly known as the Mongarlowe midge orchid is a species of small terrestrial orchid which is endemic to New South Wales. It has a single thin leaf and up to nine greenish brown to reddish flowers with a purplish labellum. It grows with grasses and shrubs on the Southern Tablelands.

Description
Up to nine greenish brown to reddish flowers are arranged along  of the flowering stem which is taller than the leaf. As with others in the genus, the flowers are inverted so that the labellum is above the column rather than below it. There is a callus in the centre of the labellum and extending almost to its tip. Flowering occurs between January and April.

Taxonomy and naming
Genoplesium oliganthum was first formally described in 2001 by David Jones who published the description in The Orchadian from a specimen collected near Braidwood. In 2002, Jones and Mark Clements changed the name to Corunastylis oligantha. The specific epithet (oliganthum) is derived from the Ancient Greek words oligos meaning "few, little" or "scanty" and anthos meaning "flower".

Distribution and habitat
The Mongarlowe midge orchid grows with grasses and shrubs in woodland between Mongarlowe, Braidwood and Nerriga.

References

oliganthum
Endemic orchids of Australia
Orchids of New South Wales
Plants described in 2001